Inez Fabbri (26 January 1831 – 30 August 1909), née Agnes Schmidt, was an Austrian American soprano, voice teacher and impresaria. She sang in Austria, Germany, England, South America and the Caribbean, making her home in San Francisco where, in the 1870s, she was the most important musical personality and prima donna assoluta of her time, performing in more than 150 concerts and operas from 1872 to 1879, producing operas, and teaching voice to up-and-coming singers.

Early career
She was the daughter of an impoverished Viennese textile manufacturer. She made a successful operatic debut in Kassa, Hungary, (now Košice, Slovakia) in Donizetti's Lucrezia Borgia in 1847. After a few years on the road singing in Königsberg (1856–1857) and Potsdam (1857), she arrived at the Hamburgischerer Stadttheater where, among other roles, she received recognition for Valentine in Meyerbeer's Les Huguenots which became one of her starring roles.

Here she met Richard Mulder (1822–1874), a Dutch musician and impresario whom she married in 1858. He organized a tour to South America (1858–59) during which time she sang in Argentina, Brazil and Chile. From then on she would use her stage name, "Fabbri"  (Italian for "Schmidt/Smith").

American career
 
In 1860, she was engaged by Max Maretzek to sing at his Winter Garden Theatre in New York. Her highly acclaimed American debut was as Violetta in Verdi's La Traviata. Shortly thereafter, she sang Elvira in Ernani in which The New York Times wrote  that "she was more dramatic and powerful" [than in her role as Violetta] and "a dramatic actress of the first class". "Mme. Fabbri was called out twice after each act, and the finale to the third act was encored."

Her debut at the Winter Garden was followed by tours in the American Mid-West, Canada and the Caribbean Islands. She was especially well received in Puerto Rico but lost all her  possessions in a fire. In 1862–1863, she and her husband returned to Europe on a tour. From May 1863 to March 1864, she sang thirty-seven performances at the Wiener Hofoper in  roles which included Elvira and Leonore in Verdi's Ernani and Il Trovatore, Raquel in Halévy's La Juive, and Alice and Berthe in Meyerbeer's Robert le diable and Le Prophète.

From 1864–1871 they lived in Frankfurt am Main where Fabbri was engaged to sing at the Stadttheater in roles which included Elisabeth in Wagner's Tannhäuser. She was described by critics at this time as a soprano with a strong, clear voice suitable for both coloratura and dramatic roles. After a guest performance at the Royal Opera, Covent Garden, she returned to New York in 1872 for an engagement with the Habelmann-Formes opera company.

San Francisco

In 1872, she went to San Francisco with the company where she sang at the California Theatre. She and her husband settled there and from 1873 to 1874 they produced forty-three operas, staging the first production of Die Zauberflöte in the city. Her husband founded a music school in San Francisco which she took over on his death in 1874. She continued to give concerts and to produce operas, many of which she performed in herself. From 1875 to 1876 she directed and sang in sixty operas. Her repertoire included some forty-six different roles.

On 17 January 1876, she inaugurated the new opera house, later renamed the Grand Opera House, in Snow Flake! And The Seven Pigmies.

Later years
In 1878, she married, secondly, the baritone Jacob Müller (or Muller), a former student of her late husband. In 1881, she ended her singing career but continued  her activities as an impresaria. After large financial losses she lived in Los Angeles from 1891 but later returned to San Francisco where she again lost her assets in a fire believed to be arson. In 1901, her second husband died. In 1905 she produced an opera for the last time.

Death
She died in San Francisco, California in 1909, aged 78. Her archives are housed at the University of California, Berkeley. and her definitive original portrait is housed at the San Francisco Museum of Performing Arts and Design as donated by the Constance Jacoby Horstman and Janet Richmond Families.

Notes

References

1831 births
1909 deaths
Austrian Empire emigrants to the United States
Impresarios
Austrian operatic sopranos
Austrian theatre managers and producers
19th-century Austrian actresses
19th-century Austrian women opera singers
19th-century American women opera singers
American operatic sopranos
Voice teachers
Women music educators